The Shingwedzi River is a river in Limpopo Province, South Africa, and Gaza Province, Mozambique. It is a left hand tributary of the Olifants River (Rio dos Elefantes) and the northernmost river of its catchment area, joining it at the lower end of its basin. The Shingwedzi is a seasonal river whose riverbed is dry for prolonged periods.

Course
The Shingwedzi River drains the plain southeast of the Soutpansberg. Its sources are about 40 km to the ESE of Thohoyandou and about 20 km west of the town of Malamulele, in the Mulamula area.  It flows eastwards across the lowveld and enters the area of the Kruger National Park.

The main rivers of the Shingwedzi basin are the Mandzoro River, Mphongolo River, Phugwane River, Gole River, Shisha River, Tshamidzi River, Bububu River and the Dzombo River.

Two dams on the river are located within the Kruger National Park near the Shingwedzi rest camp; the Kanniedood Dam and the Sirheni Dam.  The Makuleke Dam is in the Mphongolo River.
After crossing into Mozambique, the river bends and flows southeastwards. Further downstream the Shingwedzi flows close to the northeastern side of the Massingir Dam's reservoir and joins the Olifants about 12 km down river from the dam wall.

This river is a good place for observing large herds of African bush elephants, herds of 50 to 60 individuals being common in its basin.

See also
Great Limpopo Transfrontier Park
 Kruger National Park
 List of rivers of South Africa

References

External links

The Olifants River Basin, South Africa
The Olifants River System
The Olifants River

Olifants River (Limpopo)
Geography of Gaza Province
Rivers of Limpopo